William Garrison is the name of:
 William Lloyd Garrison (1805–1879), abolitionist
 William Garrison (geographer) (1924–2015), geographer and professor
 William F. Garrison, US general